S. R. Raja s/o Raghunathan is an Indian politician of Tamil Nadu. He was elected as the Tamil Nadu Member of the legislative assembly from Tambaram constituency as a Dravida Munnetra Kazhagam candidate in the 2016 Tamil Nadu Legislative Assembly election and 2006 Tamil Nadu Legislative Assembly election. He lost the Tambaram constituency to T. K. M. Chinnayya
in the 2011 election.

Electoral performance

References

Dravida Munnetra Kazhagam politicians
Living people
Year of birth missing (living people)
Tamil Nadu MLAs 2021–2026
Tamil Nadu MLAs 2016–2021